In Norse mythology, Ginnungagap ("gaping abyss", "yawning void") is the primordial void mentioned in the Gylfaginning, the Eddaic text recording Norse cosmogony.

Etymology
Ginnunga- is usually interpreted as deriving from a verb meaning "gape" or "yawn", but no such word occurs in Old Norse except in verse 3 of the Eddic poem "Vǫluspá", "gap var ginnunga", which may be a play on the term. In her edition of the poem, Ursula Dronke suggested it was borrowed from Old High German ginunga, as the term Múspell is believed to have been borrowed from Old High German. An alternative etymology links the ginn- prefix  with that found in terms with a sacral meaning, such as ginn-heilagr, ginn-regin (both referring to the gods) and ginn-runa (referring to the runes), thus interpreting Ginnungagap as signifying a "magical (and creative) power-filled space".

Creation
Ginnungagap appears as the primordial void in the Norse creation account. The Gylfaginning states:

In the northern part of Ginnungagap lay the intense cold of Niflheim, and in the southern part lay the equally intense heat of Muspelheim. The cosmogonic process began when the effulgence of the two met in the middle of Ginnungagap.

Geographic rationalization

Scandinavian cartographers from the early 15th century attempted to localize or identify Ginnungagap as a real geographic location from which the creation myth derived. A fragment from a 15th-century (pre-Columbus) Old Norse encyclopedic text entitled Gripla (Little Compendium) places Ginnungagap between Greenland and Vinland:

A scholion in a 15th-century manuscript of Adam of Bremen's Gesta Hammaburgensis Ecclesiae Pontificum similarly refers to Ghimmendegop as the Norse word for the abyss in the far north.

Later, the 17th-century Icelandic bishop Guðbrandur Thorlaksson also used the name Ginnungegap to refer to a narrow body of water, possibly the Davis Strait, separating the southern tip of Greenland from Estotelandia, pars America extrema, probably Baffin Island.

In popular culture 

 Ginnungagap is song taken from the forthcoming Jethro Tull album, RökFlöte, and released as a single on January 20, 2023. 

 Ginnungagap is featured in the Marvel Universe, as a void that existed before the formation of the world. In this place were formed entities such as the Elder Gods, Xian, Ennead, Frost Giants, Fire Demons, Nyx and Amatsu-Mikaboshi.

 In the Netflix series Ragnarok, Ginnungagap is visited as camping site for a classroom field trip during Season 1, Episode 4; it also happens to be the name of this particular episode. In Season 2, Episode 2, Ginnungagap is visited by the characters Laurits and Vidar, and is depicted as a scenic vantage point overlooking a fjord and two adjoining mountains.

 Alastair Reynolds' space opera novel Absolution Gap features a chasm named Ginnungagap Rift.

 Swedish death metal band, Amon Amarth and their 2001 album The Crusher features a track titled, "Fall Through Ginnungagap".

 EVE Online has a black hole whose accretion disk shows up in the skybox named Ginnungagap.

 "Ginungagap" (sic) is the title of a science fiction short story by Michael Swanwick.
 French neofolk group SKÁLD included a song titled "Ginnunga" in their 2018 album Vikings Chant.
 Ginnungagap (ギンヌンガガプ Ginnungagapu) is a weaponized grimoire introduced in Fire Emblem Fates, a video-game franchise published by Nintendo. It is a high-level item that hits the hardest of all tomes and scrolls in the game.
 Ginungagap is the hub world  of the video game Jotun.
 In PlatinumGames's Bayonetta 3, the main characters travel through the multiverse, and the Ginnungagap is used as a gateway. In the game, it is referred to as "Ginnungagap, the Chaotic Rift".
 A variation of Ginnungagap called "The Spark of the World" appears in the 2022 action-adventure video game God of War Ragnarök. This location becomes accessible during the main quest while in Muspelheim, appearing as a cosmic tapestry of orange sparks merged with blue-tinged essence, presumably from Niflheim.

See also 
 Abyss (religion)
 Chaos (mythology)
 Plane (esotericism)
 Void (astronomy)

Notes

References 
 Dillmann, F. X. (1998). "Ginnungagap" in: Beck, H., Steuer, H. & Timpe, D. (Eds.) Reallexikon der germanischen Altertumskunde, Volume 12. Berlin: de Gruyter. .

External links 
 Guðbrandur Thorlaksson's 1606 map of the North Atlantic

Locations in Norse mythology
Chaos (cosmogony)